Ichthyophis is a genus of caecilians (limbless amphibians, sometimes called the Asian caecilians) found in Southeast Asia, the southern Philippines, and the western Indo-Australian Archipelago.

In Sri Lanka, three species occur. All are found in almost all habitats, but are known to prefer moist ones. A new species was recently discovered called Ichthyophis multicolor.

Species

References 

 AmphibiaWeb: Information on amphibian biology and conservation. [web application]. 2008. Berkeley, California: Ichthyophis. AmphibiaWeb, available at http://amphibiaweb.org/. (Accessed: August 13, 2008).
 

 
Amphibians of Asia
Amphibian genera
Taxa named by Leopold Fitzinger